is a 1993 platform game developed and published by Konami for the Sega Genesis. It was released in North America on August 5, 1993, in Japan on August 6, 1993, and in Europe in September 1993. Rocket Knight Adventures was designed by Nobuya Nakazato, designer of Contra games such as The Alien Wars, Hard Corps and Shattered Soldier.

The game involves Sparkster, an opossum knight who wields a rocket pack and sword that can emit energy projectiles as he attempts to stop the Devotindos Empire, an evil empire that attempts to break the seal of a powerful starship that has the ability to destroy planets.

Gameplay 

Rocket Knight Adventures is a side-scrolling platform game where the player guides Sparkster through linear levels. The player can jump and attack using Sparkster's sword, which can either hit enemies directly or by emitting energy projectiles that travel a short distance. If the Attack button is held until the blue bar on the top of the screen is filled in, Sparkster will charge a "rocket attack". When the player lets go of the Attack button, Sparkster will perform a rocket attack where he blasts into one of eight directions where the player has inputted on the directional pad (if no direction is pressed, Sparkster will perform a stationary spinning attack).

Sparkster has a limited amount of vitality that decreases when he is hit by enemies, projectiles or stage hazards. The player will lose one life if either the vitality bar depletes, Sparkster falls into a bottomless pit or outside the stage (in the fourth stage and during the Axel fight in the seventh stage), touches the spikes in the cart segment of the second stage or touches the lava at the beginning of the third stage. Sparkster can replenish vitality by collecting apples and bananas (apples restore a small number of hit points while bananas restore a large number of hit points). The amount of vitality replenished depends on the game's difficulty level. The game ends if the player runs out of extra lives, however the player is allowed to use a limited number of continues (except in the Very Hard (Crazy Hard in Japan), where there are no continues) and can start at the beginning of the stage where they got a Game Over. Extra lives can be obtained by collecting 1UP items spread throughout some levels; or by achieving 20,000 points, with each other extra life being obtained every 60,000 points.

The game is composed of seven stages, with each stage composed of several sections and each one ending with a boss fight. Levels are occasionally switched up with alternate styles of gameplay. Some sections of the game are played similar to horizontal scrolling shooters (akin to Gradius, often with in-level references to that game), while the boss fight of the fifth stage has the player controlling a large robot mech to duel with the antagonist Axel Gear.

The game features four difficulty options, with harder difficulties increasing the power of the enemy attacks and reducing the number of lives and continues the player starts with. The difficulty levels in the game are differently presented in each regional version of the game. Both the Japanese and European versions have two difficulty levels accessible normally via the options menu, while in the American version four are enabled by default.

Plot 
The first king of Zephyrus (labelled as Zebulos in the international manuals), El Zephyrus (El Zebulos internationally) had led his clan to defeating an evil empire who had constructed a starship known as the Pig Star, which had the power to destroy planets. Knowing the Pig Star would be sought by the evil, the King had magically sealed the starship and protected the "Key to the Seal" by having it guarded and passed by his royal family over generations, and forming an elite group of warriors known as the Rocket Knights to protect the kingdom. Around this time, an orphan named Sparkster was taken in by Mifune Sanjulo; a friend of the King, and current leader of the "Rocket Knights". Sparkster was trained to become a Rocket Knight at an early age. Sparkster would become the new leader of the Rocket Knights after banishing Axel Gear from Zephyrus, a corrupt "Black Knight", for destroying Mifune.

In the events of the game, the kingdom of Zephyrus had come under attack by the Devotindos Empire, led by Emperor Devilgus Devotindos who has come in search for the key to the seal. Sparkster heads to the Zephyrus castle to find Axel Gear kidnapping Princess Sherry, who is the one who knows the location to the key. Before Sparkster is able to catch Axel, Axel escapes into a large airship and blows Sparkster away to a nearby desert, prompting Sparkster to chase Axel. Sparkster eventually reaches the Kingdom of Devotindos, and reaches the Devontindos castle to confront Devilgus. Sparkster frees Sherry, however Devilgus, having obtained the Key, escapes into space to reach the Pig Star. Sherry casts a spell on Sparkster's rocket pack that allows him to chase Devilgus. After a fight with Devilgus in the Pig Star, it is revealed that Devilgus is a robot; Sparkster manages to defeat him either way. After a melee fight with Axel Gear, Sparkster eventually confronts Devilgus in his true form. Sparkster defeats Devilgus, causing the Pig Star to explode.

Sparkster escapes in a nearby escape pod, however Devilgus attempts a last-ditch effort to kill Sparkster in the escape pod. Devilgus eventually burns apart while entering Elhorn's atmosphere. Sparkster lands back safely in Zephyrus, reunites Princess Sherry with King Zebulos and flies off elsewhere.

Reception 

Rocket Knight Adventures was well received by critics, who praised the music and graphics. HonestGamers gave the game a 9/10. Sega-16 gave it the same mark, saying that "it is not only one of the system’s best titles, it’s one of the greatest platformers ever made".

Legacy 
A SNES version of Rocket Knight Adventures was planned but was never released.

The Sparkster character would be advertised as Konami's mascot, appearing on several Konami advertisements and game manuals.

The game would be followed by a direct sequel, Sparkster: Rocket Knight Adventures 2 on the Sega Genesis in 1994. A spin-off game, Sparkster, would be released in the same year for the Super Nintendo Entertainment System. A revival of the series, Rocket Knight was released in 2010, developed by British studio Climax Group and was released for Xbox 360, PlayStation 3 and Steam.

Sparkster has appeared as a playable character in games such as New International Track & Field for Nintendo DS and Krazy Kart Racing for iPhone and iPod Touch. He also has cameos in Ganbare Goemon 2: Kiteretsu Shōgun Magginesu for the SNES, Snatcher for the Mega-CD, Jikkyō Power Pro Wrestling '96: Max Voltage for the SNES, Mitsumete Knight for the PlayStation, he was disguised by Pastel in TwinBee PARADISE in Donburishima for PC, and a figure resembling him also appears in an alternate ending to Contra: Shattered Soldier for the PlayStation 2, and as nonogram pixel on Pixel Puzzle Collection for the iPhone and Android.

Notes

References

External links 
 

1993 video games
Konami franchises
Konami games
Platform games
Cancelled Super Nintendo Entertainment System games
Sega Genesis games
Sega Genesis-only games
Side-scrolling video games
Side-scrolling platform games
Steampunk video games
Video games scored by Aki Hata
Video games scored by Akira Yamaoka
Video games scored by Michiru Yamane
Single-player video games
Video games developed in Japan